The Toretocnemidae were a group of ichthyosaurs that lived in the Late Triassic period.

References
Maisch, M.W. and Matzke, A.T., 2000, "The Ichthyosauria", Stuttgarter Beiträge zur Naturkunde Series B (Geologie und Paläontologie), 298: 1-159

Late Triassic ichthyosaurs
Prehistoric reptile families